Tsade (also spelled , , , , tzadi, sadhe, tzaddik) is the eighteenth letter of the Semitic abjads, including Phoenician ṣādē , Hebrew ṣādi , Aramaic ṣāḏē , Syriac ṣāḏē  ܨ, Ge'ez ṣädäy ጸ, and Arabic  . Its oldest phonetic value is debated, although there is a variety of pronunciations in different modern Semitic languages and their dialects. It represents the coalescence of three Proto-Semitic "emphatic consonants" in Canaanite. In Aramaic, these emphatic consonants coalesced instead with ʿayin and ṭēt, respectively, thus Hebrew ereṣ ארץ (earth) is araʿ ארע in Aramaic.

The Phoenician letter is continued in the Greek san (Ϻ) and possibly sampi (Ϡ),  and in Etruscan 𐌑 Ś. It may have inspired the form of the letter tse in the Glagolitic and Cyrillic alphabets.

The corresponding letter of the Ugaritic alphabet is 𐎕  ṣade.

The letter is named "tsadek" in Yiddish, and Hebrew speakers often give it a similar name as well. This name for the letter probably originated from a fast recitation of the alphabet (i.e., "tsadi, qoph" → "tsadiq, qoph"), influenced by the Hebrew word tzadik, meaning "righteous person".

Origins
It may have come from a Proto-Sinaitic script based on a pictogram of a plant, perhaps a papyrus plant, or a fish hook (in Modern Hebrew,   means "[he] hunt[ed]", and in Arabic   means "[he] hunted").

Hebrew tsadi

Name
In Hebrew, the letter's name is tsadi or ṣadi, depending on whether the letter is transliterated as Modern Israeli "ts" or Tiberian "ṣ". Alternatively, it can be called tsadik or ṣadik, spelled צָדִּיק, influenced by its Yiddish name tsadek and the Hebrew word tzadik.

Variations
, like kaph, mem, pe, and nun, has a final form, used at the end of words.

Pronunciation
In Modern Hebrew, צ tsade represents a voiceless alveolar affricate . This is the same in Yiddish. Historically, it likely represented a pharyngealized ; which became  in Ashkenazi pronunciation. A geresh can also be placed after tsade, giving it the sound  (or, in a hypercorrected pronunciation, a pharyngealized ), e.g.  chips.

Ṣade appears as  amongst Yemenite Jews and other Jews from the Middle East.

Some Sephardi Jews pronounce צ like a regular s, and this is the sound value it has in Judaeo-Spanish, as in "masa" (matzo) or "sadik" (tzadik).

Significance
In gematria,  represents the number 90. Its final form represents 900, but this is rarely used, taw, taw, and qof (400+400+100) being used instead.

As an abbreviation, it stands for ṣafon, north.

 is also one of the seven letters that receive a special crown (called tagin) when written in a Sefer Torah. See shin, ‘ayin, nun, zayin, and gimmel.

Arabic ṣād

The letter is named  and in Modern Standard Arabic is pronounced .

It is written in several ways depending in its position in the word:

Chapter Ṣād of the Quran is named for this letter, which begins the chapter.

Character encodings

See also
Ṣ
Z → Usage
Tse (Cyrillic)

Notes

External links

Phoenician alphabet
Arabic letters
Hebrew letters
Letters with final form